"Disease" is the first single released from American rock band Matchbox Twenty's third album, More Than You Think You Are. The track was co-written by Matchbox Twenty lead singer Rob Thomas and Rolling Stones frontman Mick Jagger. Released on September 30, 2002, the song peaked at number 29 on the US Billboard Hot 100. "Disease" was one of two songs written by Thomas and presented to Jagger while he was producing his solo album Goddess in the Doorway, alongside "Visions of Paradise". Jagger returned "Disease" to Thomas, saying "It sounds like you. It's your song."

Music video
The video, directed by Phil Harder, starts with a man turning on his colorful boomboxing, then roller skating over a wide section of New York City, amid images of the band illuminated on moving billboards. During the second chorus, we see the band performing in a large outdoor roller-rink, complete with a disco ball. They are surrounded by a crowd dancing along, and to begin the 3rd chorus, Rob slides off the stage on all fours onto the dance floor past the crowd. At the end of the song, the roller skater shuts off his beat box and then proceeds up some stairs, presumably to his home.

Track listings

 Australian CD single
 "Disease"
 "Push" (country version from VH1 Storytellers)
 "Crutch" (from VH1 Storytellers)

 German CD single
 "Disease"
 "If You're Gone" (live)

 UK CD single
 "Disease"
 "If You're Gone" (live)
 "Disease" (acoustic)

Charts

Weekly charts

Year-end charts

Release history

References

2002 singles
2002 songs
Atlantic Records singles
Matchbox Twenty songs
Music videos directed by Phil Harder
Song recordings produced by Matt Serletic
Songs written by Mick Jagger
Songs written by Rob Thomas (musician)